The Madina Mosque is a four-storeyed mosque in Shillong, India. It took one and a half years to complete and is the only glass mosque in India. It serves Meghalaya's largest Muslim community, the Sunni Muslims. Combined with the adjoining Meherba Orphanage, Islamic Library & Information Centre, and Islamic Theological Institute Markaz, it is one of the largest mosques in Northeast India, and the biggest in Meghalaya, accommodating more than 2,000 worshippers for congregational prayers.

The mosque was opened by the General Secretary of the Shillong Muslim Union Sayeedullah Nongrum and was inaugurated by Salman Khurshid, Shamim Akhtar and Vincent Pala.

Structure 
The Madina Mosque is a large, multi-domed structure, with a central prayer hall and several smaller prayer rooms and courtyards. The mosque is constructed of brick and concrete, with decorative elements such as arched windows and intricate carvings. The exterior of the mosque is painted in a traditional white and green color scheme, and the central dome is adorned with gold-colored trim. The Mosque is 121 feet high and 61 feet wide. The four storied structure of the religious place also has an orphanage, a library, and an Islamic theological institute. The mosque and the adjoining Idgah has capacity to accommodate 8000 people for an assembly or prayer. 

The highest number of people, who contributed to the construction of mosque were Christians and Hindus. The Mosque also has a large garden with several plants. Over the years, it has acquired increasing significance in the world as a center for Islamic study and spirituality.

Women in the mosque
Madina Masjid has a capacity of around 2,000 people and has separate space for women to offer prayers.

Prayer
This mosque is a venue of celebration during festivals of Eid al-Fitr and Eid al-Adha, by the local Muslim community. There are rickshaws available at the main Ponda bus stand which can take you to the site of the Safa Masjid. A lot of devotees celebrate their festivals here with due solemnity and are often seen rejoicing.

References

Mosques in Meghalaya
Buildings and structures in Meghalaya
Mosques completed in 2012
Glass buildings